The 2001–02 Czech 2. Liga was the ninth season of the 2. česká fotbalová liga, the second tier of the Czech football league.

League standings

Top goalscorers

See also
 2001–02 Czech First League
 2001–02 Czech Cup

References

 Official website 
 RSSSF

Czech 2. Liga seasons
Czech
2001–02 in Czech football